Oliver Cracknell (born 26 May 1994) is a professional rugby union player for Leicester Tigers in England's Premiership Rugby, he plays as a flanker. He was also a Wales under-20 international. 

Cracknell signed for London Irish on 2nd November 2021, having previously played for Ospreys, Cardiff RFC and Bridgend Ravens.  He also represented RGC 1404 and was a member of the Leeds Tykes academy. He was called up to Wales 2017 Six Nations squad on 17 January 2017.

Cracknell signed for Leicester Tigers on 12 May 2022. Cracknell made his Leicester debut on 10 September 2022 in a 24-20 defeat away top Exeter Chiefs.  He scored his first try for the club the following week against Newcastle Falcons.

References

External links 
Ospreys Player Profile
itsrugby.co.uk Profile

1994 births
Living people
English people of Welsh descent
English rugby union players
Leicester Tigers players
London Irish players
Ospreys (rugby union) players
RGC 1404 players
Rugby union players from Leeds
Rugby union flankers